Lorenzo Giustino and Gonçalo Oliveira were the defending champions but only Oliveira chose to defend his title, partnering Andrei Vasilevski. Oliveira lost in the final to Jurij Rodionov and Emil Ruusuvuori.

Rodionov and Ruusuvuori won the title after defeating Oliveira and Vasilevski 6–4, 3–6, [10–8] in the final.

Seeds

Draw

References

External links
 Main draw

Shymkent Challenger - Doubles
2019 Doubles